Eetu Qvist (born June 10, 1983) is a Finnish former ice hockey centre.

Qvist played in the SM-liiga for SaiPa and KalPa between 2003 and 2007, playing  a total of 210 games. He then spent the next seven seasons in Sweden, playing in the HockeyAllsvenskan for IK Oskarshamn, IF Björklöven, Bofors IK and Asplöven HC, as well as in Hockeyettan for IF Sundsvall Hockey.

On July 15, 2014, Qvist returned to Finland to sign for Iisalmen Peli-Karhut of the Suomi-sarja for one season before retiring.

Career statistics

References

External links

1983 births
Living people
Asplöven HC players
IF Björklöven players
Bofors IK players
Finnish ice hockey centres
Iisalmen Peli-Karhut players
KalPa players
IK Oskarshamn players
People from Kuopio
SaiPa players
IF Sundsvall Hockey players
Finnish expatriate ice hockey players in Sweden
Sportspeople from North Savo